Spaceway-2  is part of DirecTV's constellation of direct broadcast satellites. The satellite was launched via an Arianespace Ariane 5 ECA rocket from Kourou, French Guiana on 16 November 2005. Spaceway-2 is a Boeing 702-model satellite with a 12-year life expectancy. It is expected to support high-definition television to DirecTV customers with its Ka-band communications payload. Although Spaceway-2 was originally built by Boeing to be used for broadband Internet access via Hughes Network Systems, it has been retrofitted to deliver HD local channels (NBC, ABC, CBS, and Fox) to numerous markets nationwide.

On 19 April 2006, the satellite was delivered to DirecTV's control after successful on-orbit testing. Spaceway-2 immediately started broadcasting HD locals to DirecTV customers in eight more markets:  Minneapolis, Minnesota; Sacramento and San Diego, California; Pittsburgh, Pennsylvania; Nashville, Tennessee; Kansas City, Missouri; Columbus, Ohio; and Birmingham, Alabama. Satellites named T10 (launched in 2007) and T11 (launched in 2008), constructed by Boeing, also for use in high-definition television, are bent-pipe Ka-band satellites instead of regenerative satellites, and are being used to continue the expansion of DirecTV's HD services.

Spaceway-2 was originally envisioned as a global Ka-band communications system.

Boeing retrofitted the Spaceway-2 satellite for bent-pipe Ka-band communications for use in high-definition television and disabled the regenerative on-board processing of the original system that was to be used for the Spaceway broadband satellite communications.

T11 is co-located with Spaceway-2 satellites in order to use the 500 MHz of unused spectrum for HDTV broadcasting. This spectrum was originally intended for the broadband internet capabilities of the two Spaceway satellites which were disabled by Hughes Network Systems at the request of DirecTV.

See also 

 Spaceway

References

External links 
 Arianespace Spaceway 2 Launch Info
 Spaceway 2 Launch Press Release

Satellites using the BSS-702 bus
Communications satellites in geostationary orbit
DirecTV